Rob Mounsey (born December 2, 1952) is an American musician, composer, and arranger.

Music career
Mounsey was born in Berea, Ohio, and grew up in Seattle, Washington, spending a few years each in Findlay and Granville, Ohio. At the age of 17, he was awarded a 1970 BMI Student Composer Award for his orchestral work Ilium, New York, Is Divided into Three Parts. He attended Berklee College of Music in Boston from 1971 to 1975.

In 1976, he moved to New York City to become a studio musician, arranger, and producer for a wide range of well-known artists, including Aaron Neville, Aztec Camera, Brian Wilson, Carly Simon, Chaka Khan, Chromeo, Brett Eldredge, Diana Krall, Diana Ross, Donald Fagen, Eric Clapton, James Taylor, Karen Carpenter, Madonna, Michael Franks, Natalie Cole, Paul Simon, Rihanna, Steely Dan, and others. He performed on keyboards in 1981 for Simon and Garfunkel's Concert in the Park.

In 1985, he played keyboards in a New-York-based group called Joe Cool with Will Lee, Jeff Mironov and Christopher Parker. They released one album, Party Animals, on the Pony Canyon label in Japan, followed by a Japanese tour.

Mounsey released three solo albums as a recording artist: Dig (Sona Gaia, 1990), and two self-released albums on his own Monkeyville label, Back in the Pool and Mango Theory.

He toured as musical director and pianist for Idina Menzel in her Pops Symphony tours (2010-2015,) for which he created nearly all of the arrangements.

He has composed for film and television, including the 1988 Mike Nichols film Working Girl (with Carly Simon), the film Bright Lights, Big City (with Donald Fagen) and the HBO hit series Sex and the City. Mounsey wrote two long-running Emmy-winning themes for the television show Guiding Light. He is a six-time Grammy Award nominee, and a winner of two Emmy Awards. He is a Zen Buddhist who resides in Brooklyn, New York.

Selected discography

As leader
 Local Color with Steve Khan (Denon, 1987)
 You Are Here with Steve Khan (Siam, 1998)
 Dig with the Flying Monkey Orchestra (Sona Gaia, 1989)
 Back in the Pool with the Flying Monkey Orchestra (Monkeyville, 1993)
 Mango Theory with the Flying Monkey Orchestra (Monkeyville, 1995)
 Party Animals with Joe Cool (Canyon, 1985)

As producer
 Nature Boy, Aaron Neville (Verve, 2003)
 Passionfruit, Michael Franks (Warner Bros., 1983)
 Skin Dive, Michael Franks (Warner Bros., 1985)
 The Camera Never Lies, Michael Franks (Warner Bros., 1987)
 Love, Aztec Camera (WEA, 1987)
 Billy's Back on Broadway, Billy Porter (Concord, 2014)
 Barefoot at the Symphony, Idina Menzel (Concord, 2011)
 Glow, Brett Eldredge 2016
 Destination Moon, Deborah Cox (Universal, 2007)
 There Were Signs, Bill Gable (Private Music, 1989)

As arranger/pianist
With Steely Dan
 Gaucho (MCA, 1980)

With Donald Fagen
 Nightfly (Warner Bros., 1982)

With Paul Simon
 Hearts and Bones (Warner Bros., 1983)
 Graceland (Warner Bros., 1986)

With James Taylor
 Hourglass (Columbia, 1997)
 October Road (Columbia, 2002)
 James Taylor at Christmas (Columbia, 2006)
 Before This World (Concord, 2015)

With Michael Franks
 Objects of Desire (Warner Bros., 1982)
 Passionfruit (Warner Bros., 1983)
 Skin Dive (Warner Bros., 1985)
 The Camera Never Lies (Warner Bros., 1987)

With Art Garfunkel
 Fate for Breakfast (CBS, 1979)
 Scissors Cut (Columbia, 1981)
 The Animals' Christmas by Jimmy Webb (CBS, 1986)

With Cissy Houston
 Cissy Houston (Private Stock, 1977)
 Think It Over (Private Stock, 1978)
 Step Aside for a Lady (Columbia, 1979)

With Steve Khan
 Arrows (Columbia, 1979)
 Borrowed Time (Tone Center, 2007)
 Subtext (ESC, 2014)
 Backlog (ESC, 2016)
 Parting Shot (Tone Center, 2011)

With Diana Ross
 Why Do Fools Fall in Love (Capitol/EMI 1981)
 Silk Electric (Capitol, 1982)
 Ross (RCA, 1983)

With David Spinozza
 Spinozza (A&M, 1978)

With Spyro Gyra
 Carnaval (MCA, 1980)
 Freetime (MCA, 1981)
 Incognito (MCA, 1982)

With others
 Ashford & Simpson, Stay Free (Warner Bros., 1979)
 Ashford & Simpson, A Musical Affair (Warner Bros., 1980)
 Aztec Camera, Love (WEA, 1987)
 Bee Gees, Still Waters (Polydor, 1997)
 George Benson, 20/20 (Warner Bros., 1985)
 Michael Bolton, The Hunger (Columbia, 1987)
 Michael Buble, It's Time (143/Reprise, 2005)
 Jocelyn Brown, One from the Heart (Warner Bros., 1987)
 Tom Browne, Browne Sugar (Arista/GRP, 1979)
 Cindy Bullens, Desire Wire (United Artists, 1978)
 The Carpenters, Lovelines (A&M, 1989)
 Karen Carpenter, Karen Carpenter (A&M, 1996)
 Carlene Carter, Two Sides to Every Woman (Warner Bros., 1979)
 Chiara Civello, Last Quarter Moon (Verve Forecast, 2005)
 Eric Clapton, Journeyman (Reprise, 1989)
 Joe Cocker, Civilized Man (Capitol, 1984)
 Jude Cole, Jude Cole (Warner Bros., 1987)
 Natalie Cole, Stardust (Elektra, 1996)
 Natalie Cole, Ask a Woman Who Knows (Verve, 2002)
 Phil Collins, Against All Odds (Take a Look at Me Now) (Atlantic, 1984)
 Elvis Costello, Painted from Memory (Mercury, 1998)
 Deborah Cox, Destination Moon (Decca, 2007)
 Eddie Daniels, Blackwood (GRP, 1989)
 Carol Douglas, Burnin'  (Midsong, 1978)
 Ronnie Dyson, If the Shoe Fits (Columbia, 1979)
 Euclid Beach Band (Epic/Cleveland, 1979)
 Donald Fagen, The Nightfly (Warner Bros., 1982)
 Renee Fleming, Christmas in New York (Decca, 2014)
 Roberta Flack, Blue Lights in the Basement (Atlantic, 1977)
 Roberta Flack, Roberta Flack (Atlantic, 1978)
 Steve Goodman, Say It in Private (Asylum, 1977)
 Heather Headley, This Is Who I Am (RCA/BMG, 2002)
 Jay Hoggard, Days Like These (GRP, 1991)
 Garland Jeffreys, One-Eyed Jack (A&M, 1978)
 Billy Joel, The Nylon Curtain (Columbia, 1982)
 Billy Joel, The Bridge (Columbia, 1986)
 Elton John, Aida (Rocket/Island, 1999)
 Michael Johnson, Lifetime Guarantee (Magic, 1999)
 Jill Jones, Jill Jones (Paisley Park, 1987)
 Rickie Lee Jones, Pirates (Warner Bros., 1981)
 Patricia Kaas, Dans Ma Chair (Columbia, 1997)
 Karen Kamon, Voices (Atco, 1987)
 Joyce Kennedy, Wanna Play Your Game! (A&M, 1985)
 Chaka Khan, I Feel for You (Warner Bros., 1984)
 Chaka Khan, CK (Warner Bros., 1988)
 Gladys Knight, About Love (Columbia, 1980)
 Gladys Knight, Touch (Columbia, 1981)
 Dave Koz, At the Movies (Capitol, 2007)
 Diana Krall, Live in Paris (Verve, 2002)
 Will Lee, Oh! (Go Jazz, 1994)
 Lyle Lovett, Smile Songs from the Movies (Curb/(MCA, 2002)
 Teo Macero Presents, Impressions of Virus (Denon, 1980)
 Ralph MacDonald, Surprize (Polydor, 1985)
 Ralph MacDonald, Port Pleasure (Videoarts 1998)
 Jimmy Maelen, Beats Workin'  (Pavillion, 1980)
 John Mayall, Bottom Line (DJM, 1979)
 Idina Menzel, Live Barefoot at the Symphony (Concord, 2012)
 George Michael, Songs from the Last Century (Virgin/Aegean, 1999)
 Eddy Mitchell, La Meme Tribu (Polydor, 2017)
 Eddy Mitchell, La Meme Tribu Volume 2 (Polydor, 2018)
 Jane Monheit, Taking a Chance On Love (Sony Classical, 2004)
 Milton Nascimento, Nascimento (Warner Bros., 1997)
 Aaron Neville, Nature Boy: the Standards Album (Verve, 2003)
 Jane Olivor, The Best Side of Goodbye (Columbia, 1980)
 Donny Osmond, This Is the Moment (Decca, 2001)
 Teddy Pendergrass, TP (Philadelphia International, 1980)
 Jimmy Ponder, All Things Beautiful (Lester Radio, 1978)
 Sheryl Lee Ralph, In the Evening (New York Music, 1984)
 Jess Roden, The Player Not the Game (Island, 1977)
 Mark Sholtez, Real Street (Universal/Verve, 2006)
 Carly Simon, Hello Big Man (Warner Bros., 1983)
 Carly Simon, Coming Around Again (Arista, 1987)
 Paul Simon, Hearts and Bones (Warner Bros., 1983)
 Paul Simon, Graceland (Warner Bros., 1986)
 Simon & Garfunkel, The Concert in Central Park (Warner Bros., 1982)
 Valerie Simpson, Dinosaurs Are Coming Back Again (Hopsack & Silk, 2012)
 Phoebe Snow, Something Real (Elektra, 1989)
 The Spinners, Dancin' and Lovin' (Atlantic, 1979)
 The Spinners, Labor of Love (Atlantic, 1981)
 Steely Dan, Gaucho (MCA, 1980)
 Rod Stewart, It Had to Be You: The Great American Songbook (J/BMG, 2002)
 Rod Stewart, As Time Goes By: The Great American Songbook Vol. II (J/BMG, 2003)
 Ruben Studdard, Soulful (J/19 Recordings, 2003)
 James Taylor, October Road (Columbia, 2002)
 Dionne Warwick, Sings Cole Porter (Arista, 1990)
 Sadao Watanabe, Good Time for Love (Elektra, 1986)
 Sadao Watanabe, Earth Step (Verve Forecast, 1993)
 Jaki Whitren, Rhythm Hymn (Elektra, 1983)
 Brian Wilson, Brian Wilson (Sire/Reprise, 1988)
 Steve Winwood, Back in the High Life (Island, 1986)
 Steve Winwood, The Finer Things (Island, 1995)
 Lee Ann Womack, The Season for Romance (MCA Nashville, 2002)
 Michael Zager, Let's All Chant (Private Stock, 1978)
 Michael Zager, Life's a Party (Private Stock, 1979)

References

External links
 Official site
 
 

1952 births
Living people
Ambient composers
People from Berea, Ohio
American jazz musicians
American music arrangers
American session musicians
American jazz composers
American male jazz composers
Record producers from Ohio
Aztec Camera members
People from Granville, Ohio
People from Findlay, Ohio
American jazz keyboardists
American jazz pianists
American male pianists
American rock keyboardists
American rhythm and blues keyboardists
American soul keyboardists
American Zen Buddhists
Berklee College of Music alumni
21st-century American keyboardists
21st-century American male musicians